The Beijing–Taipei Expressway, designated as G3 and commonly known as the Jingtai Expressway, is a partially completed Chinese expressway that, if fully constructed, would connect Mainland China with Taiwan. Currently, the expressway is complete from Beijing to Fuzhou, Fujian, and is fully complete in Mainland China except for a small section in Fujian which is under construction.

In Taiwan, the expressway is proposed to connect with a hypothetical G99 Taiwan Ring Expressway in New Taipei City, which would supposedly encircle the island of Taiwan, as proposed by the People's Republic of China.

The project has been the source of some controversy because of Taiwan's political status. The People's Republic of China claims Taiwan, but has never administered it, so therefore does not have any control of its highways. As Taiwan does not recognize the highway designation by the People's Republic of China and has its own highway system, the Taiwan portion of the expressway has not been constructed. Aside from politics, the other challenge is the engineering difficulties in constructing the link through the Taiwan Strait. A bridge seems less likely than an undersea tunnel, which would have to exceed 100 kilometres in length. This is further complicated given the climatic and weather conditions across the straits.

In China, it connects the cities of Beijing, Tianjin, Jinan, Tai'an, Hefei, and Fuzhou.

Route

The expressway passes the following major cities:
 Beijing
 Langfang, Hebei
 Tianjin
 Cangzhou, Hebei
 Dezhou, Shandong
 Jinan, Shandong
 Tai'an, Shandong
 Zaozhuang, Shandong
 Huaian, Jiangsu
 Huaibei, Anhui
 Suzhou, Anhui
 Bengbu, Anhui
 Hefei, Anhui
 Tongling, Anhui
 Huangshan, Anhui
 Quzhou, Zhejiang
 Nanping, Fujian
 Fuzhou, Fujian

Detailed Route

See also 
Taiwan Strait Tunnel Project
Tongling Bridge

References 

Proposed roads in Taiwan
Proposed bridges in Asia
Proposed undersea tunnels in Asia
Expressways in Taiwan Province, People's Republic of China
Expressways in Fujian
Expressways in Hebei
Expressways in Jiangsu
Expressways in Anhui
Expressways in Zhejiang
Expressways in Beijing
Expressways in Tianjin
Expressways in Shandong
03
Cross-Strait relations
Taiwan Strait